Andritz may refer to:

 Andritz (Graz), district in Graz, Austria
 Andritz AG, Austrian company